This is a list of categories of awards commonly awarded through organizations that bestow film awards, including those presented by various film, festivals, and people's awards.

Best Actor/Best Actress
See Best Actor#Film awards, Best Actress#Film awards, and List of awards for supporting actor#Film.

Best Adapted Screenplay
A "Best Adapted Screenplay" award is generally issued for the best achievement in transferring a written work from another genre, such as a novel or comic book, in whole or in part, to a feature film.
 AACTA Award for Best Adapted Screenplay
 Academy Award for Best Adapted Screenplay
 BAFTA Award for Best Adapted Screenplay
 Canadian Screen Award for Best Adapted Screenplay
 César Award for Best Adaptation
 Golden Horse Award for Best Adapted Screenplay
 Goya Award for Best Adapted Screenplay
 Satellite Award for Best Adapted Screenplay
 Writers Guild of America Award for Best Adapted Screenplay

Best Original Screenplay
 AACTA Award for Best Original Screenplay
 Academy Award for Best Original Screenplay
 BAFTA Award for Best Original Screenplay
 Canadian Screen Award for Best Original Screenplay
 Golden Horse Award for Best Original Screenplay
 Goya Award for Best Original Screenplay
 Satellite Award for Best Original Screenplay
 Writers Guild of America Award for Best Original Screenplay

Best Animated Feature Film
 Academy Award for Best Animated Feature
 Africa Movie Academy Award for Best Animation
 Annie Award for Best Animated Feature
 Annie Award for Best Animated Feature – Independent
 Asia Pacific Screen Award for Best Animated Feature Film
 Austin Film Critics Association Award for Best Animated Film
 BAFTA Award for Best Animated Film
 Boston Society of Film Critics Award for Best Animated Film
 César Award for Best Animated Film
 Chicago Film Critics Association Award for Best Animated Film
 Critics' Choice Movie Award for Best Animated Feature
 Dallas–Fort Worth Film Critics Association Award for Best Animated Film
 Detroit Film Critics Society Award for Best Animated Feature
 European Film Award for Best Animated Feature Film
 Florida Film Critics Circle Award for Best Animated Film
 Golden Globe Award for Best Animated Feature Film
 Goya Award for Best Animated Film
 Japan Academy Prize for Animation of the Year
 Los Angeles Film Critics Association Award for Best Animated Film
 Mainichi Film Award for Best Animation Film
 National Board of Review Award for Best Animated Film
 National Film Award for Best Animated Film
 New York Film Critics Circle Award for Best Animated Film
 Online Film Critics Society Award for Best Animated Film
 San Diego Film Critics Society Award for Best Animated Film
 San Francisco Film Critics Circle Award for Best Animated Feature
 Satellite Award for Best Animated or Mixed Media Feature
 Saturn Award for Best Animated Film
 St. Louis Gateway Film Critics Association Award for Best Animated Film
 Toronto Film Critics Association Award for Best Animated Film
 Washington D.C. Area Film Critics Association Award for Best Animated Feature

Best Cinematography
 AACTA Award for Best Cinematography
 Academy Award for Best Cinematography
 BAFTA Award for Best Cinematography
 Canadian Screen Award for Best Cinematography
 Cesar Award for Best Cinematography
 Golden Horse Award for Best Cinematography
 Filmfare Award for Best Cinematography
 Independent Spirit Award for Best Cinematography
 Magritte Award for Best Cinematography

Best Costume Design
 AACTA Award for Best Costume Design
 Academy Award for Best Costume Design
 BAFTA Award for Best Costume Design
 Canadian Screen Award for Best Costume Design

Best Director 
 AACTA Award for Best Direction
 Academy Award for Best Director
 BAFTA Award for Best Direction
 Canadian Screen Award for Best Director
 César Award for Best Director
 Citra Award for Best Director
 Crystal Simorgh for Best Director
 Empire Award for Best Director
 Empire Award for Best British Director
 European Film Award for Best Director
 Golden Globe Award for Best Director
 Golden Horse Award for Best Director
 Goya Award for Best Director
 Independent Spirit Award for Best Director
 Japan Academy Prize for Director of the Year
 Lux Style Award for Best Film Director
 Polish Academy Award for Best Director
 Satellite Award for Best Director
 Saturn Award for Best Director

Best Film Editing
AACTA Award for Best Editing
Academy Award for Best Film Editing
American Cinema Editors
BAFTA Award for Best Editing
Canadian Screen Award for Best Editing
César Award for Best Editing
Critics' Choice Movie Award for Best Editing
Genie Award for Best Film Editing
German Film Prize for Best Editing
Golden Horse Award for Best Film Editing
Online Film Critics Society Award for Best Editing
San Diego Film Critics Society Award for Best Editing
Satellite Award for Best Editing
Saturn Award for Best Editing

Best Foreign Language Film
A "Best Foreign Language Film" is generally awarded to a film originating in a country and language different from those where the award is being given.
 Academy Award for Best International Feature Film, until 2020 called Best Foreign Language Film
 BAFTA Award for Best Film Not in the English Language, until 1990 called Best Foreign Language Film
 Golden Globe Award for Best Foreign Language Film
 Japan Academy Prize for Outstanding Foreign Language Film
Golden Eagle Award for Best Foreign Language Film

Best Makeup
 Academy Award for Best Makeup and Hairstyling
 BAFTA Award for Best Makeup and Hair
 Canadian Screen Award for Best Hair
 Canadian Screen Award for Best Makeup
 Saturn Award for Best Make-up
 Broadcast Film Critics Association Award for Best Makeup
 Metro Manila Film Festival Award for Best Make-up Artist
 Nandi Award for Best Makeup Artist
 Nandi Award for Best Makeup Artist
 IIFA Award for Best Makeup
 National Film Award for Best Make-up Artist
 Vijay Award for Best Make Up Artistes
 Kerala State Film Award for Best Makeup Artist
 Africa Movie Academy Award for Best Makeup
 ARY Film Award for Best Makeup and Hairstyling
 Tamil Nadu State Film Award for Best Make-up Artist

Best Picture
 AACTA Award for Best Film
 Academy Award for Best Picture
 BAFTA Award for Best Film
 BAFTA Award for Outstanding British Film
 Boston Society of Film Critics Award for Best Film
Cairo International Film Festival
 Canadian Screen Award for Best Motion Picture
 Cannes Film Festival’s Palme d’Or
 César Award for Best Film
 Critics' Choice Movie Award for Best Picture
 Crystal Simorgh for Best Film
 Empire Award for Best Film
 Empire Award for Best British Film
 Filmfare Award for Best Film
 Golden Globe Award for Best Motion Picture – Drama
 Golden Globe Award for Best Motion Picture – Musical or Comedy
 Guldbagge Award for Best Film
 Los Angeles Film Critics Association Award for Best Film
 Independent Spirit Award for Best Film
 MTV Movie Award for Best Movie
 Lux Style Award for Best Film
 NAACP Image Award for Outstanding Motion Picture
 National Board of Review Award for Best Film
 National Film Award for Best Feature Film
 National Society of Film Critics Award for Best Film
 New York Film Critics Circle Award for Best Film
 Producers Guild of America Award for Best Theatrical Motion Picture

Best Production Design
 AACTA Award for Best Production Design
 Academy Award for Best Production Design – Formally known as Best Art Direction
 BAFTA Award for Best Production Design
 César Award for Best Production Design
 National Film Award for Best Production Design
 Metro Manila Film Festival Award for Best Production Design
 Polish Academy Award for Best Production Design
 Golden Calf for Best Production Design
 Bavarian Film Awards (Production Design)
 European Film Award for Best Production Designer
 Africa Movie Academy Award for Best Production Design
 Satellite Award for Best Art Direction and Production Design
Saturn Award for Best Production Design

Best Score (or Best Original Score)
 AACTA Award for Best Original Music Score
 Academy Award for Best Original Score
 Academy of Canadian Cinema and Television Award for Best Achievement in Music – Original Score
 BAFTA Award for Best Film Music
 Canadian Screen Award for Best Original Score
 Golden Globe Award for Best Original Score
 Grammy Award for Best Score
 Satellite Award for Best Original Score

Best Song (or Best Original Song)
 Academy Award for Best Original Song
 Broadcast Film Critics Association Award for Best Song
 Canadian Screen Award for Best Original Song
 Golden Globe Award for Best Original Song
 Grammy Award for Best Song Written for Visual Media
 Guild of Music Supervisors Award for Best Song Written and/or Recording Created for a Film
 Lux Style Award for Best Song of the Year
 Satellite Award for Best Original Song

Best Sound

 AACTA Award for Best Sound
 Academy Award for Best Sound
 BAFTA Award for Best Sound
 Broadcast Film Critics Association Award for Best Sound
 Canadian Screen Award for Best Overall Sound
 Canadian Screen Award for Best Sound Editing
 César Award for Best Sound
 David di Donatello for Best Sound
 Filmfare Award for Best Sound Design
 Golden Calf for Best Sound Design
 IIFA Award for Best Sound Recording
 Kerala State Film Award for Best Sound Recordist
 Laurence Olivier Award for Best Sound Design
 Online Film Critics Society Award for Best Sound
 Polish Academy Award for Best Sound
 Satellite Award for Best Sound

Best Special Effects (or Best Visual Effects)

 Academy Award for Best Visual Effects, which was called "Best Special Effects" from 1939 to 1963, and included both visual and sound effects from 1939 to 1962
 BAFTA Award for Best Special Visual Effects, which has been known as that since it was introduced in 1982
 Canadian Screen Award for Best Visual Effects
 Satellite Award for Best Visual Effects

See also
 List of films considered the best

Film awards by category